The streaky-breasted flufftail (Sarothrura boehmi) is a species of bird in the family Sarothruridae.

It is sparsely spread across wet grasslands of central Africa.

The name of this bird commemorates the German zoologist Richard Böhm.

References

External links
 Streaky-breasted flufftail - Species text in The Atlas of Southern African Birds.

streaky-breasted flufftail
Fauna of Zambia
streaky-breasted flufftail
Taxonomy articles created by Polbot